"Pink Youth" is a song by Malaysian singer Yuna featuring English rapper, Little Simz, released as a third single for her fourth international studio album (her seventh overall), Rouge. It is co-written by Yuna, Chloe Angelides, Robin Hannibal, Joel van Djik, Jason Pounds and Little Simz and released on 30 June 2019 by Verve Forecast Records.

Background and release
Yuna announced the release of her new album and the third single which highlighting the female empowerment. She got an inspiration to wrote "Pink Youth" based on her past experience on gender discrimination. Yuna said:

In an interview with The Star, Yuna reveals that the song was inspired by No Doubt's 1995 song "Just a Girl".

Music video
The official video for "Pink Youth" was premiered on Yuna's official YouTube and Vevo account on 30 June 2019. It features futuristic anime theme with story and concept by Yuna and her husband, Adam Sinclair. The video features the animated visuals of Yuna and Little Simz saving the world from forces trying to capture all colour and hope from the world. It was directed by Esteban Valdez who also wrote and edited the video.

Critical reception
In a retrospective review of Rouge, Skylar de Paul from The Daily Californian described the song "a discernibly 80s-influenced dance beat drives the groove of the song, resembling a modern Madonna revival". Adriane Pontecorvo from PopMatters called the song a "nu-disco banger" and "an obvious highlight".

Release history

References

2019 singles
2019 songs
Yuna (singer) songs
Animated music videos
Little Simz songs
Songs written by Little Simz
Songs written by Chloe Angelides
Songs written by Robin Hannibal
Songs written by Yuna (singer)
Female vocal duets